James Hope may refer to:
Sir James Hope (Royal Navy officer) (1808–1881), British admiral
Sir James Hope of Hopetoun (1614–1661), Scottish industrialist and politician
James Hope (Ireland) (1764–1846), Irish rebel
James Archibald Hope (1786–1871), British Army officer
James Hope (physician) (1801–1841), English cardiologist
James Hope, 1st Baron Rankeillour (1870–1949), British politician
James Hope (footballer), English footballer for Sunderland
James Haskell Hope (1874–1952), Superintendent of Education in the state of South Carolina
James Hope-Johnstone, 3rd Earl of Hopetoun (1741–1816), Scottish peer
James Hope-Scott (1812–1873), English barrister
James Hope (1807–1854), later known as James Hope-Wallace, Member of Parliament for Linlithgowshire
Jamie Hope, fictional character in British soap opera, Emmerdale
Jimmy Hope (1836–1905), American burglar
Jimmy Hope (footballer) (1919–1979), Scottish football (soccer) player
James Hope Grant, British Army officer

See also
James Hopes (born 1978), Australian cricketer